The Estadio Olímpico de Saltillo is a multi-use stadium in Saltillo, Coahuila, Mexico. It is currently used mostly for football matches and is the home stadium for Saltillo F.C..

The stadium has a capacity of 7,000 people for football matches and 8,000 for American football games, due to the addition of temporary stands in both ends of the field. There are plans from Atlético Saltillo to upgrade the stadium so that it fulfills Serie A requirements.

The stadium previously hosted the Dinos de Saltillo of the Liga de Fútbol Americano Profesional (LFA), from 2017 to 2021. In 2022, Dinos moved to the Estadio Francisco I. Madero.

The stadium has an adjacent parking lot with 80 spaces.

References

External links

Sports venues in Coahuila
Football venues in Mexico
Athletics (track and field) venues in Mexico
Saltillo
American football venues in Mexico